Chloroclystis nigrilineata is a moth in the family Geometridae. It was described by Warren in 1898. It is found in Australia (Queensland).

References

External links

Moths described in 1898
nigrilineata